Events from the year 1947 in Michigan.

Top stories
The Associated Press polled editors of its member newspapers in Michigan and ranked the state's top news stories of 1947 as follows:
 Death of Henry Ford (227 points)
 Judge Frank Albert Picard decision (143 points)
 Terpenning murder (137 points)
 Corrections department probe (134 points)
 UAW contracts with GM, Ford, and Chrysler (129 points)
 1947 Michigan Wolverines football team (117 points)
 Spring floods (103 points)
 Budget dilemma (94 points)
 Skillman grand jury (59 points)
 Detroit Tigers' sale of Hank Greenberg to the Pittsburgh Pirates (51 points)

Office holders

State office holders
 Governor of Michigan: Kim Sigler (Republican)
 Lieutenant Governor of Michigan: Eugene C. Keyes (Republican) 
 Michigan Attorney General: Eugene F. Black (Republican)
 Michigan Secretary of State: Frederick M. Alger Jr. (Republican)
 Speaker of the Michigan House of Representatives: Victor A. Knox (Republican)
 Chief Justice, Michigan Supreme Court:

Mayors of major cities
 Mayor of Detroit: Edward Jeffries (Republican)
 Mayor of Grand Rapids: George W. Welsh (Republican)
 Mayor of Flint: Edward J. Viall
 Mayor of Saginaw: Harold J. Stenglein
 Mayor of Lansing: Ralph Crego

Federal office holders
 U.S. Senator from Michigan: Homer S. Ferguson (Republican)
 U.S. Senator from Michigan: Arthur Vandenberg (Republican) 
 House District 1: George G. Sadowski (Democrat)
 House District 2: Earl C. Michener (Republican)
 House District 3: Paul W. Shafer (Republican)
 House District 4: Clare Hoffman (Republican)
 House District 5: Bartel J. Jonkman (Republican)
 House District 6: William W. Blackney (Republican)
 House District 7: Jesse P. Wolcott (Republican)
 House District 8: Fred L. Crawford (Republican)
 House District 9: Albert J. Engel (Republican)
 House District 10: Roy O. Woodruff (Republican)
 House District 11: Frederick Van Ness Bradley (Republican)
 House District 12: John B. Bennett (Republican)
 House District 13: Howard A. Coffin (Republican)
 House District 14: Harold F. Youngblood (Republican)
 House District 15: John D. Dingell Sr. (Democrat)
 House District 16: John Lesinski Sr. (Democrat)
 House District 17: George Anthony Dondero (Republican)

Population

Companies
The following is a list of major companies based in Michigan in 1947.

Sports

Baseball
 1947 Detroit Tigers season – The Tigers compiled an 85–69 record and finished in second place in the American League. The team's statistical leaders included George Kell with a .320 batting average and 93 RBIs, Roy Cullenbine with 24 home runs, and Hal Newhouser with a 2.87 earned run average.
 1947 Michigan Wolverines baseball season - Under head coach Ray Fisher, the Wolverines compiled an 18–10 record. Cliff Wise was the team captain.

American football
 1947 Detroit Lions season – The Lions compiled a 3–9 record under head coach Gus Dorais. The team's statistical leaders included Clyde LeForce with 1,384 passing yards, Camp Wilson with 412 rushing yards, and John Greene with 621 receiving yards. 
 1947 Michigan Wolverines football team – Under head coach Fritz Crisler, Michigan compiled a perfect 10–0 record, won the Big Ten Conference championship, and defeated the USC Trojans by a score of 49–0 in the 1948 Rose Bowl game.
 1947 Michigan State Spartans football team – 
 1947 Detroit Titans football team –

Basketball
 1946–47 Michigan Wolverines men's basketball team – The team compiled a 12–8 record under head coach Osborne Cowles. Mack Supronowicz was the team's leading scorer with 228 points in 20 games for an average of 11.4 points per game.  Pete Elliott was the team captain.

Ice hockey
 1946–47 Detroit Red Wings season – Under coach Jack Adams, the Red Wings compiled a 22–27–11 record. The team's statistical leaders included Roy Conacher with 30 goals and Billy Taylor with 46 assists and 63 points.

Boat racing
 APBA Gold Cup – 
 Harmsworth Cup –
 Port Huron to Mackinac Boat Race –

Boxing

Golfing
 Motor City Open - 
 Michigan Open -

Other

Chronology of events

Births
 March 12 - Mitt Romney, businessman and politician who served as Governor of Massachusetts (2003-2007) and the Republican Presidential candidate (2012), in Detroit
 April 21 - Iggy Pop, singer, songwriter, musician, producer and actor, and vocalist of The Stooges, in Muskegon, Michigan
 August 5 - Bernie Carbo, Major League Baseball outfielder (1969–1980), in Detroit

Deaths
 April 7 - Henry Ford, founder of Ford Motor Co., at age 83 in Dearborn

See also
 History of Michigan
 History of Detroit

References